The Inland Vessels (Amendment) Act, 2007 is an Act of the Parliament of India enacted to facilitate the extension and usage of inland waterways by vessels. It is an amendment to an original Act passed in 1917. The Act came into force from 21 February 2008.

Inland water traffic amounts to only 0.17% of total inland traffic in India. The act address the extension of inland water limits, facilitating safety of vessels by dividing the inland water area into three zones based on maximum significant wave height criteria, employment of manpower from Army, Navy and Coast Guard in this sector, controlling pollution and regulating the insurance regime on par with motor vehicles.

References 

Acts of the Parliament of India 2007
Water transport in India
2007 in India
2007 in law
Ministry of Ports, Shipping and Waterways (India)